(also known as Classic Action: Devilish) is a breakout clone video game developed by Starfish for the Nintendo DS. It is the third entry in the Devilish series, released 13 years after its predecessor, Devilish: The Next Possession for the Genesis. Like its predecessor, it is a game in the same genre of Breakout and Arkanoid, with elaborate fantasy visuals.

Reception

Devilish: Ball Bounder received negative reviews from critics upon its release in North America. On Metacritic, the game holds a score of 40/100 based on 6 reviews, indicating "generally unfavorable reviews."

References

External links 
  

Video game sequels
Nintendo DS games
Nintendo DS-only games
2005 video games
Breakout clones
Video games developed in Japan

Single-player video games
505 Games games
UFO Interactive Games games